Geeta Tyagi is an Indian television and film actress. She is known for portraying the role of Shashikala Singh Rathore in Doli Armaano Ki, Bimla Agarwal on Aap Ke Aa Jane Se on Zee TV, Jamuna in Balika Vadhu on Colors TV and Rajrani in Kyun Utthe Dil Chhod Aaye, a show about the partition of India which aired on Sony TV.

Career
She is an alumna of the National School of Drama, passing out in 1996. In 2009, she bagged the role of Nalini in Dehleez. In 2012, she starred in the series Punar Vivah as Shobha Satyendra Dubey. In 2013, she was cast in Ek Boond Ishq as Aradhana, as well as Shashikala Rudrapratap Singh Rathore in Doli Armaano Ki. In 2016, she joined the cast of Ek Duje Ke Vaaste as Manju Tiwari. In late 2017, she was cast in Aap Ke Aa Jane Se as Bimla Agarwal. Then she was seen as Rajrani in the TV show Kyun Utthe Dil Chhod Aaye. She was last playing the role of Raghav Rao's mother in Mehndi Hai Rachne Waali.

Filmography

References

External links 

Indian film actresses
Indian television actresses
Indian soap opera actresses
Living people
Actresses in Hindi cinema
Actresses in Hindi television
Actresses from Dehradun
20th-century Indian actresses
21st-century Indian actresses
Year of birth missing (living people)